Cinara, the conifer aphids or giant conifer aphids, is a genus of aphids in the family Aphididae. They are widespread in the Northern Hemisphere.

These aphids specialize on conifers in the pine and cypress families.

Some species are pests that attack cultivated Christmas trees. The parasitoid wasp species in the genus Pauesia are specific to the genus.

Cinara cedri has been shown to host three symbionts: Buchnera aphidicola, a secondary symbiont, and bacteria in the genus Wolbachia.

There are about 243 species in this genus.

Species include:
 Cinara abietis
 Cinara acutirostris
 Cinara cedri
 Cinara confinis
 Cinara cupressi
 Cinara fornacula
 Cinara laricis
 Cinara piceae
 Cinara piceicola
 Cinara pini
 Cinara pilicornis
 Cinara strobi

References

External links 

Bugguide.net. Genus Cinara - Giant Conifer Aphids

Lachninae
Sternorrhyncha genera